Bedardi Saiyaan is a Pakistani drama serial broadcast in 2017 on Geo Entertainment. It was directed by Mohsin Mirza, written by Jahanzaib Qamar, and stars Agha Ali, Sanam Chaudhry and Ghana Ali.

Plot 
Bedardi Saiyaan captures the struggles of widowed women and their emotions. Sauliha Khatoon is one woman this drama serial revolves around— whose husband’s death leaves her with limited options for survival. She moves to her brother’s house along with a son and daughter but even seeking a favour from a blood relative comes with a price here. The downtrodden members of Sauliha Khatoon’s family face discouragement and taunts from her brother’s wife on a daily basis.

As time passes, Sauliha’s daughter and son excel in life. Their lives turn out to be all about unending tests. Sauliha’s daughter, Hania, gets trapped by a greedy and cunning man who intends to capture her money after marriage. He continuously plants diabolic schemes against his wife (Hania) for looting her business and takes maximum advantage from her efforts. She begins to question what the future really holds for her after he shows his true colors.

Cast
Sanam Chaudhry as Hania
Agha Ali as Shani
Ghana Ali as Baila; Hania's cousin
 Mirza Zain Baig as Javeed; Hania's brother
Shehryar Zaidi as Ajmal; Hania's uncle
Seemi Pasha as Nuzhat; Ajmal's wife
Shaista Jabeen as Saleha; Hania's mother
Javeria Abbasi as Rafia; Shani's sister
Anmol Baloch as Tara; Shani's sister
Jinaan Hussain as Mariam; Shani's friend
Saba Faisal as Rakhshanda; Shani's mother
Saife Hassan
Fahad Rehmani

References

Pakistani drama television series